James Hendry was a Scottish footballer who played as a forward. He played for Alloa Athletic and Manchester United.

External links
MUFCInfo.com profile

Scottish footballers
Manchester United F.C. players
Alloa Athletic F.C. players
Year of birth missing
Year of death missing
Association football forwards